The Zack Files is a Canadian sci-fi television program based on a book series of the same name, written by Dan Greenburg. It first aired on YTV from September 17, 2000 until the final episode aired in May 5, 2002. This series was shot in Toronto, Ontario.

Plot
The series revolves around a teenage boy, played by Robert Clark, who is a magnet for paranormal activity and attends Horace Hyde-White High School for Boys along with his three friends Cam, Gwen, and Spencer. Zack manages to get himself into trouble with his paranormal adventures and it is up to his friends to help him set things straight.

Characters
Zachary "Zack" Greenburg (played by Robert Clark) is the main protagonist. A relatively normal kid but often becomes a magnet for the paranormal.
Cameron "Cam" Dunleavey (played by Jake Epstein) is one of Zack's best friends who will do anything to make a quick buck.
Spencer "Spence" Sharpe (played by Michael Seater) is another of Zack's best friends and the keeper of The Zack Files who is infatuated with paranormal activity and is attempting to win the Nobel Prize by proving the paranormal exists.
Gwendolyn "Gwen" Killerby (played by Katie Boland): Gwen doesn't believe in paranormal activity and her father is headmaster of their school, which allows her to be the only girl at an all-boys academy.
Vernon Mantueffel (played by Noah Giffin) is the school bully. He is jealous of Cam, Spence and Zack. He is Zack's nemesis, the richest kid in school and is in love with Gwen. He also sweats a lot.
Daniel "Dan" Greenburg (played by Jeff Clarke) is Zack's father, divorced and kind of ignorance.
Jennifer "Woman From 302" (played by Collette Micks): Downstairs neighbour and sometimes girlfriend of Zack's father.

Telecast and home media
In the U.S., it aired on Fox Family (now known as Freeform) and Showtime Family Zone.

In August 2004, Goldhill Home Media released the first season on DVD.

As of 2023, Studio 100's miniKIDS uploaded the series' full episodes on YouTube.

Episodes

Season 1 (2000–01)

Season 2 (2001–02)

References

External links

2000 Canadian television series debuts
2002 Canadian television series endings
2000s Canadian children's television series
2000s Canadian high school television series
2000s Canadian science fiction television series
Canadian children's science fiction television series
Television series by DHX Media
Canadian television shows based on children's books
English-language television shows
Fox Family Channel original programming
ABC Family original programming
Fox Kids
YTV (Canadian TV channel) original programming
Television series about teenagers
Television shows set in Toronto
Television shows filmed in Toronto